Gulmi District, a part of Lumbini Province, is one of the seventy-seven districts of Nepal.

Introduction
Gulmi is a hilly district that lies in Lumbini Province. Surrounded by Syangja and Parbat district on the east, Palpa, and Arghakhanchi on the south, Baglung on the north, and Pyuthan on the west is renowned for coffee farming. Gulmi is widely known for introducing coffee in Nepal. It is also a major exporter of organic coffee. Gulmi is rich in natural resources such as cobalt. Festivals such as Maghe Sankranti and other festivals are popular among both tourists and locals.

The major destination with huge potential for tourism includes Bichitra Cave in Dhurkot, Resunga, with its rich biodiversity and religious value, Gyawa Kshetra, Charpala, Musikot, Isma Durbar, Wami Taksar, and Purtighat. Ruru (also known as Ridi). The district is also famous for orange farming. Dhurkot rural municipality is a major hub for orange farming. More than 10 Crore worth of orange is sold annually which includes export to India.
The district headquarter is Tamghas, a hill town situated in between Resunga and Arjun. Currently, there are ten rural municipalities and two municipalities Resunga and Musikot.

Divisions
Gulmi district is divided into total 12 Local level bodies in which two are municipality and ten are rural municipalities as below:
 Municipalities
Musikot
Resunga
 Rural municipalities
Ishma
Kaligandaki
Gulmi Darbar
Satyawati
Chandrakot
Rurukshetra
Chhatrakot
Dhurkot
Madane
Malika

Communications 
There are 76 post offices in the district including one main district post office and 14 area police offices. There are nine telecenters, six FM radio stations, and eight cable TV networks. According to Nepal Telecom, there were 82,318 GSM mobile subscribers in the district as of 2015.

Geography and climate

Demographics
At the time of the 2011 Nepal census, Gulmi District had a population of 280,160. Of these, 96.2% spoke Nepali, 1.9% Magar, 0.9% Newari, 0.3% Gurung, 0.2% Bote, 0.1% Kumhali and 0.1% other languages as their first language.

In terms of ethnicity/caste, 25.3% were Hill Brahmin, 22.5% Chhetri, 20.7% Magar, 12.0% Kami, 4.8% Sarki, 3.7% Damai/Dholi, 3.1% Kumal, 1.9% Sanyasi/Dasnami, 1.8% Newar, 1.1% Thakuri, 1.0% Gharti/Bhujel, 0.7% Gurung, 0.2% Bote, 0.2% Musalman, 0.1% Badi, 0.1% Chhantyal, 0.1% Gaine, 0.1% other Terai and 0.2% others.

In terms of religion, 96.8% were Hindu, 2.8% Buddhist, 0.2% Christian, 0.2% Muslim and 0.1% others.

In terms of literacy, 72.5% could read and write, 1.9% could only read and 25.6% could neither read nor write.

References

 
Districts of Nepal established in 1962